Diego Cochas  (born August 14, 1979 in Córdoba Province) is a retired Argentine football midfielder.

Before moving to Colombian football in 2006, Cochas played for a number of clubs in the lower leagues of Argentine football. Between 2002 and 2003 he played in the Argentine Primera with Club Atlético Huracán.

External links
 

1979 births
Living people
Argentine footballers
Categoría Primera A players
Venezuelan Primera División players
Club Atlético Huracán footballers
Ferro Carril Oeste footballers
Nueva Chicago footballers
Millonarios F.C. players
La Equidad footballers
Deportivo Pereira footballers
Deportes Tolima footballers
Cúcuta Deportivo footballers
CSyD Tristán Suárez footballers
Deportivo Táchira F.C. players
Defensores de Belgrano footballers
Argentine expatriate footballers
Expatriate footballers in Colombia
Expatriate footballers in Venezuela
Association football midfielders
Sportspeople from Córdoba Province, Argentina